Bartosz Mikos (born 8 March 1980, Kielce) is a Polish archer who competed at the 2000 Summer Olympics.

References

External links
 

1980 births
Living people
Archers at the 2000 Summer Olympics
Polish male archers
Sportspeople from Kielce
Olympic archers of Poland